Rumpus may refer to:
 Recreation room, also known under the term "rumpus room"
 Rumpus Cat, a fictional character from T. S. Eliot's Old Possum's Book of Practical Cats and the musical Cats
 Rumpus Magazine, a bi-monthly student tabloid publication at Yale College
 Rumpus McFowl, a Disney comic book character
 The Rumpus, an online literary magazine

See also
 Ruckus (disambiguation)